Nikos Nikolaou (born 23 June 1925) was a Greek rower. He competed at the 1948 Summer Olympics and the 1952 Summer Olympics.

References

External links
 

1925 births
Possibly living people
Greek male rowers
Olympic rowers of Greece
Rowers at the 1948 Summer Olympics
Rowers at the 1952 Summer Olympics
Place of birth missing